Dynjandi (also known as Fjallfoss ) is a waterfall located in Arnarfjörður in the Westfjords region of Iceland. Below it are five other waterfalls: Háifoss, Úðafoss, Göngufoss, Hundafoss and Bæjarfoss.

Dynjandi and other waterfalls in Dynjandisá and their surroundings were protected as natural monuments in 1981.

Dynjandisheiði is a mountain pass over the falls that contains the first-built car-accessible road to Ísafjörður.

Photos

References

Waterfalls of Iceland
Westfjords